Sir Robert Stephen John Sparks,  (born 15 May 1949), is Chaning Wills Professor of Geology in the Department of Earth Sciences at the University of Bristol. He is one of the world's leading volcanologists and has been widely recognised for his work in this field.

Career
Steve Sparks is a graduate of Imperial College, where he first completed a B.Sc. (1971), and then a PhD (1974) under the supervision of George P. L. Walker. He was subsequently a Research Fellow at Lancaster University (1976–1978), a NATO postdoctoral fellow at the Graduate school of oceanography, University of Rhode Island, USA (1976–1978), and then lecturer at University of Cambridge Department of Earth Sciences (1978–1989), where he was also a Fellow of Trinity Hall, Cambridge. He took up the Chaning Wills Chair of Geology at the University of Bristol in 1989. Steve has held a number of distinguished visiting positions at other universities, including a period as Sherman Fairchild Distinguished Scholar at California Institute of Technology in 1987, and as an Edward Bass Scholar at Yale University (2006–2007).

Steve Sparks has been hugely influential in the fields of both volcanology and igneous petrology. He has published over 300 papers, which have been cited more than 10,000 times, and is an ISI Highly Cited Researcher. He was elected a Fellow of the Royal Society in 1988 and a Fellow of the American Geophysical Union in 1998.

Steve Sparks has a distinguished record of service to the geological community. He was President of the Geological Society of London from 1994 to 1996, President of IAVCEI from 1999 to 2003, and is President-elect of the VGP section of the American Geophysical Union for 2009. Steve Sparks was chair of the 2008 UK Research Assessment Exercise Panel for Earth Sciences.

He became chair of ACME in 2012.

Sparks was appointed a Commander of the Order of the British Empire in the 2010 Birthday Honours for services to Environmental Sciences and a Knight Bachelor in the 2018 New Year Honours for services to Volcanology and Geology. In 2018 he received the Royal Medal.

External links
Steve Sparks' webpage at the University of Bristol

References

Commanders of the Order of the British Empire
Knights Bachelor
Fellows of the Royal Society
1949 births
Living people
British volcanologists
Petrologists
British geologists
Fellows of the American Geophysical Union
Thorarinsson Medalists